Sturgeon River—Parkland is a federal electoral district in the Edmonton Capital Region of northern Alberta, Canada, and has been represented in the House of Commons of Canada since 2015. It was created in 2012 from the electoral districts of Edmonton—Spruce Grove (61%), Westlock—St. Paul (33%) and Yellowhead (6%).

It was essentially the suburban portion of Edmonton—Spruce Grove. That riding's MP, Rona Ambrose of the Conservative Party of Canada, opted to transfer there, and won easily. She served as interim leader of the Tories, and hence Leader of the Opposition, until her resignation in May 2017. She retired from politics two months later, and Dane Lloyd easily retained it for the Conservatives in the by-election.

The riding was originally intended to be named Sturgeon River.

Demographics
According to the Canada 2016 Census or Canada 2011 Census

Ethnic groups: 86.9% White, 9.8% Indigenous, 0.8% Filipino, 0.6% South Asian, 0.6% Black, 1.3% Other (2011)
Languages: 91.0% English, 3.1% French, 1.3% German (2016) 
Religions: 65.8% Christian, 0.6% Traditional (Aboriginal) Spirituality, 0.6% Muslim, 0.7% Other, 32.3% None (2011) 
Median income: $47,406 (2015)

Members of Parliament
This riding has elected the following members of the House of Commons of Canada:

Election results

2017 Sturgeon River—Parkland federal by-election

References

Alberta federal electoral districts
Spruce Grove